Rosewood oil is a valuable essential oil, especially in perfumery. It contains the substance linalool, which has a number of uses.

The oil is extracted from the wood of Aniba rosaeodora and Aniba parviflora and possibly other Aniba species. When it arrives at the distillery, the wood is chipped, and then steam distilled. Each tree yields about 1% oil by weight of wood. After a history of massive overharvesting and species depletion, efforts are underway to cultivate A. rosaeodora, and to develop techniques for extracting the essential oil from leaves.

Because many unrelated woods are called "rosewood", some confusion has arisen about the origin of "rosewood oil". Members of the genus Dalbergia such as Brazilian rosewood (D. nigra) and Indian rosewood (D. latifolia) have never been a source of rosewood oil.

References

Essential oils